Southern Pro Wrestling (SPW) is a New Zealand professional wrestling promotion. Since the promotion's formation in 2015, it has promoted regular live events throughout the country predominantly in Invercargill and Queenstown In 2018, SPW held the biggest live independent wrestling show seen in New Zealand for over 27 years, the 2018 Southern Rumble, which was held at ILT Stadium in Invercargill in front of 1,200+ in attendance. SPW has led to a resurgence of the popularity and mainstream media coverage of professional wrestling in New Zealand. The 2019 Southern Rumble event was held again in ILT Stadium, with similar attendance numbers. SPW currently has over 30 full-time employees. In March 2019, SPW signed a deal with New Zealand's largest free-to-air broadcaster, TVNZ with an audience of 2 million people. 22 June 2019, marked the return of New Zealand pro-wrestling on TVNZ for the first time since On the Mat ended 35 years prior. On 24 August 2019, the 2019 Southern Rumble event aired on TVNZ Duke and was viewed by over 40,000 people.

Founders
Troy Crosbie and Marc Perry are the founders of SPW Perry was trained by WWE legend Lance Storm in Calgary, Alberta, Canada and since then has wrestled and performed across New Zealand.

Marc Perry was trained by UK World of Sport legend Steve Logan and former WWE superstar Drake Maverick. He has wrestled all over the United Kingdom, Europe, Australia and NZ and worked with well-known international wrestlers. He has taken part in WWE Tryouts and performed for New Japan Pro-Wrestling.

Notable Appearances
Various well-known international wrestlers have made appearances in SPW such as Travis Banks, Tenille Dashwood, Bea Priestley, Jimmy Havoc and Will Ospreay. Travis Banks appeared in SPW at the Southern Rumble on 13 July 2019, despite being under contract with WWE on its NXT UK brand at the time. The 2019 Southern Rumble event was a cross-promotional event with Melbourne City Wrestling (MCW)

Championships

Current champions

SPW New Zealand Championship

The SPW New Zealand Championship is the top professional wrestling championship title in the New Zealand promotion Southern Pro Wrestling (SPW). The inaugural champion was "The Shooter" Shane Sinclair, who defeated "Hooligan" Marcus Kool & "Powerhouse" T-Rex in the tournament final at the Fight For Gold event in Invercargill.

Title history

List of combined reigns

SPW New Zealand Tag Team Championship

The SPW New Zealand Tag Team Championship is the top professional wrestling tag team championship title in the New Zealand promotion Southern Pro Wrestling (SPW). The inaugural champions were NZXT (Mason Daniels & Michael Richards), who defeated the CruiserMates (Falcon Kid & Liam Fury) at the 2018 Fight For Gold event in Invercargill.

Title history

Southern Rumble History
The Southern Rumble is SPW's biggest event. A Southern Rumble event has been held every year since 2016.

Southern Rumble (2016)

Southern Rumble (2017)

Southern Rumble (2018)

Southern Rumble (2019)

Television and streaming
SPW programming is available in New Zealand on the TV channel, TVNZ Duke available on Freeview, Sky and Vodafone TV. Additionally, SPW shows are available online through TVNZ OnDemand (Not currently as of 13/08/2022). Furthermore, SPW provides a subscription video on demand service SPW On Demand with standalone Android and iOS apps, as well as via Pivotshare.

See also

Professional wrestling in New Zealand
List of professional wrestling promotions in New Zealand

References

External links
 
 Southern Pro Wrestling (SPW) - Cagematch Internet Wrestling Database

New Zealand professional wrestling promotions
2015 establishments in New Zealand
Entertainment companies established in 2015